The 1987–88 Liga Alef season saw Maccabi Tamra (champions of the North Division) and Beitar Ramla (champions of the South Division) win their regional divisions and promotion to Liga Artzit. 

At the bottom, Hapoel Bnei Tamra, Hapoel Ra'anana (from the North division), Hapoel Azor and Hapoel Ramat HaSharon (from the South division) relegated to Liga Bet.

North Division

South Division

References
Alef and Bet Leagues, 1986-87 – 1993-94  Eran R, Israblog 

Liga Alef seasons
Israel
3